Ankyrin repeat and KH domain-containing protein 1 is a protein that in humans is encoded by the ANKHD1 gene.

Function 
This gene encodes a protein with multiple ankyrin repeat domains and a single KH domain. Co-transcription of this gene and the neighboring downstream gene (EIF4EBP3) generates a transcript (MASK-BP3) which encodes a fusion protein composed of the MASK protein sequence for the majority of the protein and a different C-terminus due to an alternate reading frame for the EIF4EBP3 segments.

References

External links

Further reading